Bromus latiglumis, the earlyleaf brome, is a grass native to North America. The specific epithet latiglumis is Latin for "broad-glumed", referring to the wide glumes.

Description

The leaves are cauline. Sheaths are ribbed and glabrous, covering most nodes. The branches of the panicle are either spreading or reflexed and have large basal pulvini. The branches solitary or occur in pairs. The spikelets are loosely flowered with three to eight flowers on each spikelet. The glumes are either pilose or glabrous.

The grass flowers from August to September. The grass occurs in wet woods and prairies, stream banks, and alluvial plains.

References

latiglumis